The Williamson Flat Twin  was motorcycle made in Coventry, UK by William ('Billy') Williamson, who had been managing director of the Coventry-based Rex company. He teamed up with William Douglas (of Douglas Motorcycles to develop new prototype motorcycles under the name Williamson-Douglas and employed Billy's brother Harold as a test rider. Douglas had been developing a 964 cc water-cooled flat twin engine that could be used either for light cars or motorcycles. Billy Williamson fitted this engine into a frame with Douglas-Druid girder forks and a Douglas two-speed gearbox and a foot-operated clutch which was launched in 1912 at a cost of £82. In 1913 an air-cooled version was added to the range and in 1914 a kick starter was added. Production was halted by World War I and in 1919 the only engines available were JAP 980 cc air-cooled side valves, so Williamson redesigned the frame to fit. Unfortunately Billy Williamson suffered a fatal heart attack in 1920 after only twenty motorcycles had been produced.

References

See also
List of motorcycles of the 1910s
List of motorcycles by type of engine
List of fastest production motorcycles

 

 
 

Motorcycles of the United Kingdom
Motorcycles introduced in the 1910s
Motorcycles powered by flat engines